Siirt is a city in the Siirt District of Siirt Province in Turkey. It had a population of 160,340 in 2021.

Neighborhoods 
The city is divided into the neighborhoods of Afetevlerı, Alan, Algul, Bahçelievler, Barış, Batı, Conkbayır, Çal, Doğan, Dumlupınar, Halenze, İnönü, Karakol, Kooperatif, Sakarya, Tınaztepe, Ulus, Ülkü, Veysel Karani and Yeni.

History 
Previously known as Saird, in pre-Islamic times Siirt was a diocese of the Eastern Orthodox Church (Sirte, Σίρτη in Byzantine Greek). In the medieval times, Arzen  was the main city and it competed with Hasankeyf over the control the region, Siirt was only to become a center of the region in the 14th century. But it was still dependent from Hasankeyf until the 17th century. An illuminated manuscript known as the Syriac Bible of Paris might have originated from the Bishop of Siirt's library, Siirt's Christians would have worshipped in Syriac, a liturgical language descended from Aramaic still in use by the Syriac Rite,Chaldean Rite, other Eastern Christians in India, and the Nestorians along the Silk Road as far as China. The Chronicle of Seert was preserved in the city; it describes the ecclesiastical history of the Persian realm through to the middle of the seventh century. From 1858 to 1915 the city was the seat of a bishop of the Chaldean Catholic Church. Most of the city's Assyrians, including Addai Scher their archbishop were murdered during the Assyrian genocide along with the loss of artefacts such as the Syriac manuscript of Theodore of Mopsuestia's De Incarnatione. Also during World War I, the Armenian population of Siirt became a victim of the Armenian genocide.

Demographics 
Mark Sykes recorded Siirt as a city inhabited by Kurds, Arabs, Chaldeans, and Armenians.

İsmet İnönü referred to the city as an Arab city eager to get Turkified, while Kurds lived in the outskirts. Kurds currently constitute a majority in the city with a significant Arab community. The Kurdish tribes living in the city are the Botikan, Dudêran, Elîkan, Keşkoliyan, Silokan and Sturkiyan.

Government 
In the municipal elections of March 2019 Berivan Helen Işık of the Peoples' Democratic Party (HDP) was elected mayor. She was dismissed from her post on 15 May 2020 and detained over terror charges. Ali Fuat Atik, the Governor of the Siirt province was appointed trustee by the Ministry of the Interior.

Landmarks 
The city's landmark is the Great Mosque (Ulu Cami) built in 1129 by the Great Seljuk Sultan Mahmud II who belonged to the main branch of the dynasty that ruled from Baghdad after the Seljuks had split into several branches. The mosque was further developed by the Ottoman Empire. The mosque was restored in 1965.

Trivia 
Siirt was Turkish Prime Minister Recep Tayyip Erdoğan's constituency from 2003 to 2007. His wife, Mrs. Emine Erdoğan, is from Siirt and the PM had been elected to the Turkish Grand National Assembly in a by-election held in Siirt in 2003.

Although Siirt remains one of the poorer cities in Turkey, some neighbourhoods have fine and modern housing including new shops, banks and hotels.

Climate 
Siirt has a hot-summer Mediterranean climate (Köppen: Csa, Trewartha: Cs) with very hot, dry summers and chilly, wet winters. During winter months there is frequent frost and occasional snowfall.

Notable people 
 Addai Sher, Chaldean Catholic archbishop of Siirt in Upper Mesopotamia was martyred in Siirt in 1915 during the 1915 Assyrian genocide
 Mehmet Güney (1936*), Diplomat and judge
 Coşkun Aral (1956*),  correspondent, photo journalist, television journalist and documentary film producer.
 Ethem Sancak (1958*), Businessmen
 Yasin Aktay (1966*), Chairman of Justice and Development Party in Turkey
 Hasan Özer (1974*), footballer and manager
 Kerem Gürgen (1983*), boxer
 Evin Demirhan (1995*), freestyle wrestler

Gallery

References

External links 
  George_Grigore: Les principales caracteristiques de l'arabe parle a Siirt

 
Cities in Turkey
Populated places in Siirt Province
Kurdish settlements in Siirt Province
Historic Assyrian communities in Turkey
Arab settlements in Siirt Province